The Netherlands participated in the Eurovision Song Contest 2021 with the song "Birth of a New Age" written by Jeangu Macrooy and Pieter Perquin. The song was performed by Jeangu Macrooy, who was internally selected to represent the Netherlands at the 2021 contest after he was due to compete in the 2020 contest with "Grow" before the event's cancellation. Macrooy's re-appointment as the Dutch representative was announced on 18 March 2020, while the song, "Birth of a New Age", was presented to the public during a special live broadcast on 4 March 2021.

As the host country, the Netherlands qualified to compete directly in the final of the Eurovision Song Contest. The country placed twenty-third out of the 26 participating countries with 11 points.

Background 

Following the introduction of semi-finals for the 2004 contest, the Netherlands had featured in seven finals.

The Dutch national broadcaster, AVROTROS, broadcasts the event within the Netherlands and organises the selection process for the nation's entry. However, internal selections have also been held on occasion. Since 2013, the broadcaster has internally selected the Dutch entry for the contest. In 2013, the internal selection of Anouk performing "Birds" managed to take the country to the final for the first time in eight years and placed ninth overall. In 2014, the internal selection of the Common Linnets performing "Calm After the Storm" qualified the nation to the final once again and placed second, while the internal selection of Duncan Laurence in 2019 managed to achieve a Dutch victory for the first time since 1975. For 2021, the broadcaster opted to continue selecting the Dutch entry through an internal selection.

Before Eurovision

Internal selection 

On 18 March 2020, the Dutch broadcaster confirmed that Jeangu Macrooy would remain as the Netherlands' representative for the Eurovision Song Contest 2021. On 4 March 2021, Macrooy's Eurovision entry, "Birth of a New Age", was presented to the public during a special live broadcast streamed online via the broadcaster's YouTube channel. The selection of the song, written by Jeangu Macrooy himself together with Pieter Perquin, occurred through the decision of Macrooy and a selection commission consisting of AVROTROS general director Eric van Stade, television host and author Cornald Maas, singer and television host Jan Smit, radio DJs Coen Swijnenberg and Sander Lantinga, and Dutch Eurovision delegation member Joyce Hoedelmans. "Birth of a New Age" became the first entry in the Eurovision Song Contest to feature lyrics in the Sranan Tongo language.

At Eurovision 

According to Eurovision rules, all nations with the exceptions of the host country and the "Big Five" (France, Germany, Italy, Spain and the United Kingdom) are required to qualify from one of two semi-finals in order to compete for the final; the top ten countries from each semi-final progress to the final. The European Broadcasting Union (EBU) split up the competing countries into six different pots based on voting patterns from previous contests, with countries with favourable voting histories put into the same pot. The semi-final allocation draw held for the Eurovision Song Contest 2020 on 28 January 2020 was used for the 2021 contest, which the Netherlands was assigned to broadcast and vote in the first semi-final on 18 May 2021.

The two semi-finals and the final was broadcast in the Netherlands on NPO 1 and BVN with commentary by Cornald Maas and Sander Lantinga as well as via radio on NPO Radio 2 with commentary by Wouter van der Goes and Frank van 't Hof. The three shows were also broadcast on NPO 1 Extra with sign language interpretation and on NPO Zappelin Extra with Dutch audio description. The Dutch spokesperson, who announced the top 12-point score awarded by the Dutch jury during the final, was Romy Monteiro, who replaced Duncan Laurence after he was absent from the show due to testing positive for COVID-19.

Final 

Jeangu Macrooy took part in technical rehearsals on 13 and 15 May, followed by dress rehearsals on 17, 21 and 22 May. This included the semi-final jury show on 17 May where an extended clip of the Dutch performance was filmed for broadcast during the live show on 18 May and the jury final on 21 May where the professional juries of each country watched and voted on the competing entries. The contest's Reference Group decided that the Netherlands' running order position in the final, drawn during the Heads of Delegation meeting on 9 March 2020, would be kept, meaning that the country would perform in position 23. Following the second semi-final, the shows' producers decided upon the running order of the final rather than through another draw, so that similar songs were not placed next to each other. While the Netherlands had already been drawn to perform in position 23, it was determined that the Netherlands would perform following Norway and before the entry from Italy.

The Dutch performance featured Jeangu Macrooy wearing a blue costume and a black chest piece underneath, designed by Lissa Brandon and Silvy ten Broeke, and performing together with two backing vocalists and a dancer in costumes of Creole, Surinamese and Maroon origin. The stage LED screens displayed cracks in a dark grey wall that got bigger and increased in amount as light that in bright white and deep orange colours came through them, while the colours of the transparent LED were red and orange with a floral set-up. Both screens also displayed the Sranan Tongo lines of the song in its original and English forms. The performers moved to the catwalk during the performance where they did a traditional dance routine as the walls on the stage LED burst down, ending with a fist on their foreheads. The two backing vocalists that joined Jeangu Macrooy were Milaisa Breeveld and his twin brother Xillan Macrooy, while the dancer was Gil Gomes Leal. The staging director for the performance was Hans Pannecoucke, who worked with the Dutch entrants between 2014 and 2016 as well as in 2018 and 2019 in a similar role. The Netherlands placed twenty-third in the final, scoring 11 points: 0 points from the televoting and 11 points from the juries.

Voting 
Voting during the three shows involved each country awarding two sets of points from 1-8, 10 and 12: one from their professional jury and the other from televoting. Each nation's jury consisted of five music industry professionals who are citizens of the country they represent, with a diversity in gender and age represented. The judges assess each entry based on the performances during the second Dress Rehearsal of each show, which takes place the night before each live show, against a set of criteria including: vocal capacity; the stage performance; the song's composition and originality; and the overall impression by the act. Jury members may only take part in panel once every three years, and are obliged to confirm that they are not connected to any of the participating acts in a way that would impact their ability to vote impartially. Jury members should also vote independently, with no discussion of their vote permitted with other jury members. The exact composition of the professional jury, and the results of each country's jury and televoting were released after the grand final; the individual results from each jury member were also released in an anonymised form.

Below is a breakdown of points awarded to the Netherlands and awarded by the Netherlands in the first semi-final and grand final of the contest, and the breakdown of the jury voting and televoting conducted during the two shows:

Points awarded to the Netherlands

Points awarded by the Netherlands

Detailed voting results 
The following members comprised the Dutch jury:
 Jessica van Amerongen
 
 Gerrit-Jan Mulder (Brainpower)

References 

2021
Countries in the Eurovision Song Contest 2021
Eurovision